Yenko is a surname. Notable people with the surname include:

Aleksandr Yenko (born 1972), Moldovan athlete
Don Yenko (1927–1987), American car dealer and racecar driver
Mariano Yenko, Philippine Basketball Association Commissioner 1983–1987